Pioneer Days may refer to:
Pioneer Days (Chico, California), an annual community event
Pioneer Days (1930 film), a Mickey Mouse short
Pioneer Days (1940 film), a Western film by Harry S. Webb
Pioneer Days, an annual festival held in Kalida, Ohio

See also
Pioneer Day, a Utah state holiday